Nochaco is a hill in Los Ríos Region, southern Chile. The hill lies in the commune of Los Lagos just north of San Pedro River. Across the river in the south lies the mountain Llecué. The southern slopes are part of an epigenetic valley.

References

Hills of Chile
Mountains of Los Ríos Region